Tetreuaresta obscuriventris is a species of tephritid or fruit flies in the genus Tetreuaresta of the family Tephritidae.

Distribution
Greater Antilles, Colombia, Brazil. Introduced to Hawaii, Fiji, Tonga.

References

Tephritinae
Insects described in 1873
Diptera of South America